Maria Jamila Khan is an American-born Pakistani professional footballer who plays as a midfielder. Born in the United States, she represents and captains the Pakistan national team.

Career

In 2009, Khan joined Denver Pioneers in the United States, where she was a goalkeeper. In 2013, Khan moved to the United Arab Emirates to pursue her Masters degree. There, she transitioned into a midfielder for a amateur side where signed for an Emirati side, where she became a midfielder. It was there that she learnt more about women football in Pakistan, which eventually led her to play for WAPDA at the 2018 National Women Football Championship.

In October 2020, she was one of the 30 players called up for the training camp of the Pakistan women's national team

After that, Khan signed for an Emirati club.

She received praises from all across Pakistan including Prime Minister of Pakistan Shehbaz Sharif for her ‘bend-it-like-Beckham’ goal against Saudi Arabia

International goals

Personal life

Khan is the niece of Jahangir Khan, who is widely considered to be the best squash player of all time, and the granddaughter of squash player Hashim Khan.

References

External links
 Maria Khan at Top Drawer Soccer

Women's association football goalkeepers
Women's association football midfielders
Expatriate footballers in the United Arab Emirates
Living people
American women's soccer players
American sportspeople of Pakistani descent
Citizens of Pakistan through descent
American expatriate sportspeople in the United Arab Emirates
American expatriate women's soccer players
Pakistan women's international footballers
Pakistani expatriate sportspeople in the United Arab Emirates
Pakistani women's footballers
Year of birth missing (living people)